Mladen Popović (Serbian Cyrillic: Младен Поповић; born 29 August 1988) is a Serbian footballer.

Career
Born in Raška, Popović began his career in his native Serbia playing for Rudar Baljevac. In the 2009/10 season he moved to OFK Beograd and played in the Serbian SuperLiga. In January 2013 he moved to Novi Pazar and continue to play in Serbian SuperLiga.

References

External links
 

1988 births
Living people
Serbian footballers
Association football midfielders
FK Novi Pazar players
Serbian First League players
Serbian SuperLiga players
FK Hajduk Kula players
OFK Beograd players
FK Sloga Kraljevo players
FK Velež Mostar players
FK Sloboda Užice players
FK Jagodina players
FK Inđija players
FK Cement Beočin players
FK Dinamo Vranje players
People from Raška, Serbia